Bathothauma lyromma, the lyre cranch squid, is a highly modified species of glass squid from the family Cranchiidae with a distribution which encompasses most of the world's oceans from the tropics to high latitudes.

Description
Bathothauma lyromma is an atypical glass squid which has very large paralarva which can reach a mantle length of 100mm and has its eyes mounted on a long stalk  possesses and a very long brachial pillar. Both these features are reabsorbed as the paralarva matures into a subadult. As an adult it grows to a mantle length of 200mm. The tentacular club only has suckers while the stalk has two rows of suckers and pads at the base and four rows near the club which form an elongated carpal group. The funnel organ has an inverted V-shaped dorsal pad and has no valve. It has almost no tubercles at the fusion of the funnel and the mantle. The small, paddle shaped fins are widely separated and position sub-terminally. There is a photophore on each eye, an unusual feature in the Cranchiidae, shared only with Helicocranchia.

Distribution
Bathothauma lyromma has an extremely wide oceanic distribution and it occurs in oceans throughout the world in tropical and subtropical regions; in the Atlantic it is known to occur from 35° to 45°N to 35° to 40°S. It is, however, absent from the subtropical waters of the south-eastern Atlantic.

Biology
The long eye-stalked paralarvae of Bathothauma lyromma are plantonic and are found in the upper water column from less than 100m in depth down to 300m. As they age they undergo an ontogenetic vertical migration in which the larger individuals move down into the deeper depths of more than 1,500 m. They become sexually mature and mate at the depths.

Taxonomy
Bathothauma lyromma is currently regarded as the only species in its monotypic genus but research indicates that there may be as many as four closely related species within the species circumglobal distribution, If this is correct then this species may represent a species complex.

References

External links

Tree of Life web project: Bathothauma lyromma

Squid
Molluscs described in 1906
Bioluminescent molluscs
Cephalopods of Europe
Taxa named by Carl Chun